Schizothecium is a genus of fungi in the family Lasiosphaeriaceae.

Species
Schizothecium alloeochaetum
Schizothecium aloides
Schizothecium carpinicola
Schizothecium cervinum
Schizothecium conicum
Schizothecium curvisporum
Schizothecium curvuloides
Schizothecium dakotense
Schizothecium dubium
Schizothecium fimbriatum
Schizothecium fimicola
Schizothecium formosanum
Schizothecium glutinans
Schizothecium hispidulum
Schizothecium inaequale
Schizothecium linguiforme
Schizothecium longicolle
Schizothecium miniglutinans
Schizothecium multipilosum
Schizothecium nannopodale
Schizothecium nanum
Schizothecium oedotrichum
Schizothecium papillisporum
Schizothecium pilosum
Schizothecium simile
Schizothecium squamulosum
Schizothecium tetrasporum
Schizothecium vesticola
Schizothecium vratislaviensis

References

External links

Sordariomycetes genera
Lasiosphaeriaceae
Taxa named by August Carl Joseph Corda
Taxa described in 1838